Gangster Town is a light gun game developed for the Master System that was released in 1987. It is set in a great American city overtaken with crime during the 1920s. You are an FBI agent armed with a machine gun and courage. Your goal is to rid the town of thugs.

The game supports use of the Sega Light Phaser. Two light guns can be used simultaneously to provide co-operative play in two player mode.

Gameplay

The player(s) progress through several levels including a target range, street shoot outs, armed car chases, a bar shootout and a battle at a dock. The final stage is a boss gangster armed with a machine gun. Other criminals require only one shot to kill, causing their spirits to float upwards. The spirit can also be shot.

In the car chase sequence, the player's character drives a car along a road, approaching several criminal vehicles from behind. Each car has several gangsters who lean out of the window and return fire. Enemy cars can be destroyed by shooting the tires. The player vehicle drive automatically.

References

External links
Gangster Town at SMS Power
Gangster Town item prices on Pro MB Gaming

1987 video games
Light gun games
Master System games
Video games about police officers
Video games set in the 1920s